Neivamyrmex nigrescens is a North American species of army ant in the genus Neivamyrmex. The species is found in the United States and Mexico, and is the most widely distributed Neivamyrmex species in the United States. Due to its wide range, it has become the most studied and well-known species in its genus.

References

External links

Dorylinae
Hymenoptera of North America
Insects of Mexico
Insects of the United States
Insects described in 1872